The Defense National Stockpile Center (DNSC) is a branch of the United States' Defense Logistics Agency, whose purpose it is to store, secure, and sell raw materials. The DNSC is based in Fort Belvoir and has operations throughout the United States. Materials they offer for sale include: aluminum oxide, beryllium, chromium, cobalt, diamonds, ferrochromium, ferromanganese, iodine, iridium, mica, niobium, platinum group metals, talc, tantalum, thorium, tin, tungsten and zinc.

Facilities

The DNSC currently has facilities in, but not limited to:
Baton Rouge Depot, Baton Rouge, Louisiana
Binghamton Depot, Binghamton, New York
Binghamton Depot, Clearfield, Utah
Curtis Bay Depot, Curtis Bay, Maryland
Gadsden Depot, Gadsden, Alabama
Hammond Depot, Hammond, Indiana
New Haven Depot, New Haven, Indiana
Point Pleasant Depot, Point Pleasant, West Virginia
Scotia Depot, Scotia, New York
Sharonville Engineer Depot, Sharonville, Ohio
Former Somerville Depot, Somerville, New Jersey 152 US Highway 206 South, Hillsborough, NJ 08844
Stockton Depot, Stockton, California
Voorheesville Depot, Voorheesville, New York
Warren Depot, Warren, Ohio

The DNSC formerly had a facility north of Binghamton, New York, in Fenton, New York. A stone spillway at that location was listed on the National Register of Historic Places in 2004.

References

External links
Defense National Stockpile Center
Defense National Stockpile Center at GlobalSecurity.org

Defense Logistics Agency
Strategic reserves of the United States